Pat Cash and Paul McNamee were the defending champions but they competed with different partners that year, Cash with John Fitzgerald and McNamee with Peter McNamara.

McNamara and McNamee lost in the quarterfinals to Cash and Fitzgerald.

Ken Flach and Robert Seguso won the doubles title at the 1985 Queen's Club Championships tennis tournament defeating Ken Flach and Robert Seguso in the final 6–3, 3–6, 16–14.

Seeds

Draw

Final

Top half

Bottom half

References

External links
Official website Queen's Club Championships 
ATP tournament profile

Doubles